Haras Fyre (born January 5, 1953), also known professionally as Patrick Grant, is an American singer, songwriter, and multi-instrumentalist. After writing songs for Sister Sledge and Ben E. King early in his career in a songwriting duo with his girlfriend Gwen Guthrie, Fyre spent some time in the backing band for The Drifters, before relocating to Switzerland to become a composer of music for corporate events.

Background 
Born and raised in Newark, New Jersey, United States, Fyre's early musical influences included Victor Herbert and Frankie Valli.

As a teenager, Fyre learned to play his brother's trombone from recordings by Chicago. He subsequently began learning bass while playing with the band Parkway North from East Orange, New Jersey, borrowing a Baldwin Bass from the band's bassist Romeo Williams.

In 1971, Fyre joined a local band called the Matchmakers, where he met vocalist and pianist Gwen Guthrie. Fyre and Guthrie became romantically involved, moved in together, and joined the New York City based band East Coast of Larry Blackmon, along with The Matchmakers' saxophonist James Wheeler and trumpeter Jerome McCoggle.

Songwriting career 
The freelance producer of East Coast's second album told Fyre and Guthrie that their songs were of no commercial value and were 'unsellable'. Benny Ashburn, manager of The Commodores, disagreed, and helped them promote their songs elsewhere.

Fyre and Guthrie's demos attracted the interest of producer Bert DeCoteaux of the music publisher Penumbra Music, and Fyre began working predominantly as a bassist in New York City's music scene. One month after leaving East Coast, Fyre and Guthrie had their first international hit as songwriters, with Sister Sledge's "Love Don't You Go Through No Changes On Me", which reached #5 on the Billboard national chart, and the magazine's "Hot 100".

Of the nine songs on Sister Sledge's album Circle Of Love, seven were composed by Fyre and Guthrie. Two more of them entered the US Dance Chart's top 10, one of which, "Pain Reliever", took the Silver Award at the 1975 Tokyo Music Festival. Subsequently, Fyre and Guthrie penned Ben E. King's comeback single, "Supernatural Thing", followed by "This Time I'll Be Sweeter" (since covered by more than 100 artists).

Fyre was credited as a bassist on the Sister Sledge album as Patrick Grant, alongside his musical role model Bob Babbitt.

Haras and Guthrie penned the "It's Happening at the Phone Company" jingle for AT&T, which they also performed live at a few international trade fairs with drummer Jimmie Young, Rudy Stevenson and Bert DeCoteaux on piano. During this time, Fyre also played regularly in a band with Weather Report studio drummer Herschel Dwelllingham, pianist Nat Adderley, Jr., and singer Bobby Hill, acquiring the nickname "Dr. Bass".

Within two months of their songwriting debut, Fyre and Guthrie's "Music Machine" had written several songs that made the Billboard charts, but their relationship with Penumbra Music soon broke down due to personal differences. Guthrie quit writing with the company to become a solo session singer. One week later, Fyre wrote one final song for Penumbra, "Satan's Daughter", which appeared on the GG album of British glam rock artist Gary Glitter. Further projects in development with Fleming Williams and film composer Michael R. Colicchio were abandoned.

The Drifters 
Through his contacts with Ben E. King, Fyre moved to London to join the backing band of King's former group, The Drifters, whose lineup at the time included Johnny Moore, Billy Lewis, Joe Blunt and Clyde Brown. After two years of touring with The Drifters, Fyre returned to the US, residing for four years in Connecticut until moving permanently to Europe, settling in Switzerland.

Corporate career 
Since moving to Europe, Fyre has appeared as a musician for Germany's Allianz Insurance Group and for Formula 1 automobile races, where he featured in televised segments with Mercedes-Benz Motorsport Vice-President Norbert Haug during the motorsport season.

A fluent speaker of German, Fyre composes music for televised sporting events, corporate events and private functions. He appeared on European television as the Werbeträger (media spokesman) for the German multinational automobile firm Dekra. He made frequent appearances with Olympic gold medal gymnast Magdalena Brzeska, for whom he composed a song.

References

Living people
1953 births
Musicians from Newark, New Jersey
Singer-songwriters from New Jersey
Singer-songwriters from New York (state)
American expatriates in Switzerland